The 2017 Seoul Open Challenger was a professional tennis tournament played on outdoor hard courts. It was the third edition of the tournament. It was part of the 2017 ATP Challenger Tour. It took place in Seoul, South Korea, on 8–14 May 2017.

Singles main draw entrants

Seeds 

 1 Rankings as of 1 May 2017.

Other entrants 
The following players received wildcards into the singles main draw:
  Chung Hong
  Chung Yun-seong
  Hong Seong-chan
  Kim Young-seok

The following player received entry into the singles main draw as an alternate:
  Marko Tepavac

The following player received entry into the singles main draw as a special exempt:
  Liam Broady

The following player received entry into the singles main draw using a protected ranking:
  Alexander Ward

The following players received entry from the qualifying draw:
  Félix Auger-Aliassime
  Austin Krajicek
  Daniel Nguyen
  Shuichi Sekiguchi

The following player received entry as a lucky loser:
  Luke Saville

Champions

Singles

 Thomas Fabbiano def.  Kwon Soon-woo 1–6, 6–4, 6–3.

Doubles

 Hsieh Cheng-peng /  Peng Hsien-yin def.  Thomas Fabbiano /  Dudi Sela 5–1 ret.

References

Seoul Open Challenger
Seoul Open Challenger
2017
2017
2017 in South Korean tennis